Kargyam is a village in Leh district of the Indian union territory of Ladakh. It is located in the Durbuk tehsil (subdistrict), in the Long Parma valley between Tangtse and Chushul. Kargyam is famous for its wetlands and Blackneck crane and nomadic lifestyle.

Demographics
According to the 2011 census of India, Kargyam has 106 households. The effective literacy rate (i.e. the literacy rate of population excluding children aged 6 and below) is 59.12%.

References

Villages in Durbuk tehsil